Chlorotrianisene (CTA), also known as tri-p-anisylchloroethylene (TACE) and sold under the brand name Tace among others, is a nonsteroidal estrogen related to diethylstilbestrol (DES) which was previously used in the treatment of menopausal symptoms and estrogen deficiency in women and prostate cancer in men, among other indications, but has since been discontinued and is now no longer available. It is taken by mouth.

CTA is an estrogen, or an agonist of the estrogen receptors, the biological target of estrogens like estradiol. It is a high-efficacy partial estrogen and shows some properties of a selective estrogen receptor modulator, with predominantly estrogenic activity but also some antiestrogenic activity. CTA itself is inactive and is a prodrug in the body.

CTA was introduced for medical use in 1952. It has been marketed in the United States and Europe. However, it has since been discontinued and is no longer available in any country.

Medical uses
CTA has been used in the treatment of menopausal symptoms and estrogen deficiency in women and prostate cancer in men, among other indications. It has been used to suppress lactation in women. CTA has been used in the treatment of acne as well.

Side effects

In men, CTA can produce gynecomastia as a side effect. Conversely, it does not appear to lower testosterone levels in men, and hence does not seem to have a risk of hypogonadism and associated side effects in men.

Pharmacology

CTA is a relatively weak estrogen, with about one-eighth the potency of DES. However, it is highly lipophilic and is stored in fat tissue for prolonged periods of time, with its slow release from fat resulting in a very long duration of action. CTA itself is inactive; it behaves as a prodrug to desmethylchlorotrianisene (DMCTA), a weak estrogen that is formed as a metabolite via mono-O-demethylation of CTA in the liver. As such, the potency of CTA is reduced if it is given parenterally instead of orally.

Although it is referred to as a weak estrogen and was used solely as an estrogen in clinical practice, CTA is a high-efficacy partial agonist of the estrogen receptor. As such, it is a selective estrogen receptor modulator (SERM), with predominantly estrogenic effects but also with antiestrogenic effects, and was arguably the first SERM to ever be introduced. CTA can antagonize estradiol at the level of the hypothalamus, resulting in disinhibition of the hypothalamic–pituitary–gonadal axis and an increase in estrogen levels. Clomifene and tamoxifen were both derived from CTA via structural modification, and are much lower-efficacy partial agonists than CTA and hence much more antiestrogenic in comparison. As an example, chlorotrianisene produces gynecomastia in men, albeit reportedly to a lesser extent than other estrogens, while clomifene and tamoxifen do not and can be used to treat gynecomastia.

CTA at a dosage of 48 mg/day inhibits ovulation in almost all women. Conversely, it has been reported that CTA has no measurable effect on circulating levels of testosterone in men. This is in contrast to other estrogens, like diethylstilbestrol, which can suppress testosterone levels by as much as 96%—or to an equivalent extent as castration. These findings suggest that CTA is not an effective antigonadotropin in men.

Chemistry
Chlorotrianisene, also known as tri-p-anisylchloroethylene (TACE) or as tris(p-methoxyphenyl)chloroethylene, is a synthetic nonsteroidal compound of the triphenylethylene group. It is structurally related to the nonsteroidal estrogen diethylstilbestrol and to the SERMs clomifene and tamoxifen.

History
CTA was introduced for medical use in the United States in 1952, and was subsequently introduced for use throughout Europe. It was the first estrogenic compound of the triphenylethylene series to be introduced. CTA was derived from estrobin (DBE), a derivative of the very weakly estrogenic compound triphenylethylene (TPE), which in turn was derived from structural modification of diethylstilbestrol (DES). The SERMs clomifene and tamoxifen, as well as the antiestrogen ethamoxytriphetol, were derived from CTA via structural modification.

Society and culture

Generic names
It is also known as tri-p-anisylchloroethylene (TACE).

Brand names
CTA has been marketed under the brand names Tace, Estregur, Anisene, Clorotrisin, Merbentyl, Merbentul, and Triagen among many others.

Availability
CTA is no longer marketed and hence is no longer available in any country. It was previously used in the United States and Europe.

References

Abandoned drugs
Hormonal antineoplastic drugs
Organochlorides
Phenol ethers
Prodrugs
Progonadotropins
Selective estrogen receptor modulators
Synthetic estrogens
Triphenylethylenes
Bis(4-hydroxyphenyl)methanes